2009 Cerezo Osaka season

Competitions

Player statistics

Other pages
 J. League official site

Cerezo Osaka
Cerezo Osaka seasons